Gréta Szakmáry (born 31 December 1991) is a Hungarian volleyball player, playing as an outside-spiker. She is part of the Hungary women's national volleyball team.

She competed at the 2015 Women's European Volleyball Championship, 2017 Women's European Volleyball Championship, and 2017 FIVB Volleyball World Grand Prix.

On club level she played for Betonut- NRK Nyiregyhaza, Gödöllõ Club, Linamar-Bekescsabai RSE, and the current club is SSC Palmberg Schwerin.

References

External links

 

1991 births
Living people
Hungarian women's volleyball players
People from Nyíregyháza
Sportspeople from Szabolcs-Szatmár-Bereg County